The auction house im Kinsky is an important art auction house located in Vienna's Palais Kinsky.  The auctioneer of the house is Michael Kovacek.

Locations 

 

The auction house specialized in Austrian art, in particular modern and contemporary art, though it also deals with the Art Nouveau, antiques, Asian, Old Masters and 19th Century paintings.

Auctions 

In the almost 90 auctions im Kinsky has set records on Austrian art market. Egon Schiele's Girl from 1917 at a price of 3,562,400 euros, recorded the highest price ever achieved in Austria for a work of art. Other records were set by Egon Schiele's View of Krumau (1,233,000 euros), Ferdinand Georg Waldmüller's The End of School Lessons (1,061,000 euros) and Gustav Klimt's Helene (1,037,000 euros). This means that im Kinsky holds four of the five highest auction sales ever achieved in Austria. In 2010, Egon Schiele's The Procession was auctioned at the Kinsky for 4,437,400 euros.

On 12 April 2016, at the request of the French Ministry of Culture and an order of the Vienna Public Prosecutor's Office,  the auction of the Portrait of a Gentleman by Bartholomeus van der Helst from 1647, which had been stolen by the National Socialists in 1943, was stopped.

External links 

 Website des Auktionshauses im Kinsky

References 

Companies based in Vienna
Austrian auction houses